Pe Ell may refer to:

Pe Ell, Washington, a town in Washington State.
Pe Ell (Shannara), a character from the Shannara series of novels by Terry Brooks.

See also
 Piel (disambiguation)